Coccopigya spinigera is a species of sea snail, deep-sea limpet, a marine gastropod mollusk in the family Cocculinidae.

Distribution
 Range: 39.7°N to 28°N; 83°W to 0°W.
 Eastern Atlantic: Iceland
 North West Atlantic
 USA: Virginia, North Carolina, Florida; Florida: West Florida

Description 
The maximum recorded shell length is 3.2 mm.

Habitat 
Minimum recorded depth is 613 m. Maximum recorded depth is 1550 m.

References

External links

Cocculinidae
Gastropods described in 1883
Taxa named by John Gwyn Jeffreys